Silvestrichilis is a genus of jumping bristletails in the family Machilidae. There are about eight described species in Silvestrichilis.

Species
These eight species belong to the genus Silvestrichilis:
 Silvestrichilis cercoconicus Bach, 1979
 Silvestrichilis chinensis Kaplin, 2019
 Silvestrichilis heterotarsus (Silvestri, 1942)
 Silvestrichilis macedonica (Stach, 1937)
 Silvestrichilis polyacantha Janetschek, 1959
 Silvestrichilis trispina (Wygodzinsky, 1939)
 Silvestrichilis tuzeti Janetschek, 1955
 Silvestrichilis uncinata Janetschek, 1957

References

Further reading

 
 
 
 
 

Archaeognatha
Articles created by Qbugbot